is a Japanese professional drifting driver, currently competing in the D1 Grand Prix series for Team Toyo.

He has competed in the D1GP series since the very beginning, starting out in a Nissan Silvia PS13 He did not do very well, scoring only 2 points in his first four years. His big break came when he was signed by Aviation Performance Products, who gave him a new Nissan Silvia S15 to drive. In 2005, his first year with APP, he scored 41 points, getting a third and second place and finishing ninth overall. The year after he did even better, finishing seventh overall; this led to him moving to Team Toyo in 2007. Since then he hasn't done so well, Team Toyo S15 obviously not suiting his driving style.

However, in 2011, he won the exhibition match in Centrair, defeated his teammate Masato Kawabata. This was his first win.

He had competed in D1GP until 2015. Since 2016, he is not participating in it because he wants to focus on company management, his principal occupation.

Complete Drifting results

D1 Grand Prix

Sources
D1 Grand Prix

Japanese racing drivers
Drifting drivers
1974 births
Living people
D1 Grand Prix drivers